Patriarca–Vila Ré is a station on Line 3 (Red) of the São Paulo Metro.

SPTrans Lines
The following SPTrans bus lines can be accessed. Passengers may use a Bilhete Único card for transfer:

References

São Paulo Metro stations
Railway stations opened in 1988
1988 establishments in Brazil